Commarin is a commune in the Côte-d'Or department in eastern France.

Population

Sights
The most remarkable building in Commarin is the château, parts of which date back to the 14th century.

See also
Communes of the Côte-d'Or department

References

Communes of Côte-d'Or